Coachella Valley National Wildlife Refuge is a  protected area in Riverside County, California's Coachella Valley. It lies within the unincorporated community of Thousand Palms, just north of Palm Desert.  The refuge contains the majority of critical habitat for the Coachella Valley Fringe-toed Lizard (Uma inornata) within the Coachella Valley Preserve and Indio Hills Palms State Reserve.

Refuge habitat
The habitat of this threatened species is restricted to the refuge's dune system and a few other small areas.  This dune system is in jeopardy as development threatens sand sources and the Coachella Valley fringe-toed lizard's travel corridors.

Access
The refuge, managed by the United States Fish and Wildlife Service, provides for the only significant habitat acreage that is not available for multiple recreating uses by the public. The Coachella Valley Refuge is almost entirely closed to the public to protect the federally listed threatened Coachella Valley Fringe-toed Lizard. However, there is a trail that runs through a section of the refuge available for horseback riders.

See also

List of Sonoran Desert wildflowers

References

External links
Official Coachella Valley National Wildlife Refuge website
Coachella Valley National Wildlife Refuge Map
Official Coachella Valley Preserve website

External links
Coachella Valley Preserve trail maps
1,000 Palms Oasis historical photographs
Indio Hills Palms State Park
1,000 Palms Oasis birds checklist
 

Protected areas of the Colorado Desert
Thousand Palms, California
Coachella Valley
National Wildlife Refuges in California
Protected areas of Riverside County, California
Dunes of California
Landforms of Riverside County, California